Liane Bahler (22 January 1982 – 4 July 2007) was a German professional racing cyclist.

Bahler was born in Gotha, and started her professional career in 2001. In that year she finished third in the sixth stage of the Tour de Bretagne. In 2002, she won a stage in the Tour de l'Aude. She joined the Nürnberger Versicherung cycling team in 2003 and stayed with this team in 2004 and 2005. In 2004, she finished in second place in the Albstadt Frauen Etappenrennen. She made a move to Dutch team Therme Skin Care in 2006. She finished in second position at the Tour Cycliste Féminin de la Drôme, and third in the fourth stage of the Route de France Féminine. She also won the Köln-Hurth race that year. For the 2007 season she switched to Italian team Fenix-HPB.

On 4 July 2007 Bahler died in Rudolstadt, in a car crash, on her way to the airport, where she would have flown to Italy to start in the Giro d'Italia Femminile.

References

Death notification  
Death notification  
NOS.nl report 

1982 births
2007 deaths
Road incident deaths in Germany
German female cyclists
People from Gotha (town)
Cyclists from Thuringia
People from Bezirk Erfurt
20th-century German women
21st-century German women